Lai Expressway is the 17 km long under construction alternative road to connect Islamabad's IJP Road with GT Road. The initial cost of the project is estimated at PKR.70 billion. It will be built with the participation of government and private institutions. Asian Development Bank will provide 10 billion rupees for the installation of sewage treatment plant associated with this project.

See also
 Islamabad Expressway
 Expressways of Pakistan

References

Expressways in Pakistan
Transport in Islamabad Capital Territory
Transport in Rawalpindi
Proposed roads in Pakistan